Thanjavur is a taluk of Thanjavur district of the Indian state of Tamil Nadu.

Overview
Within the taluk are the municipality of Thanjavur and the panchayat towns of Nanjikottai, Vallam, Neelagiri, Pudupattinam, and Vilar.

Demographics
According to the 2011 census, the taluk of Thanjavur had a population of 510,411 with 253,723  males and 256,688 females. There were 1,012 women for every 1,000 men. The taluk had a literacy rate of 78.51%. Of the children less than six years of age, 23,251 were male and 21,749 were female.

Villages

References 

Taluks of Thanjavur district